Adolph Friedrich Erdmann von Menzel (8 December 18159 February 1905) was a German Realist artist noted for drawings, etchings, and paintings. Along with Caspar David Friedrich, he is considered one of the two most prominent German painters of the 19th century, and was the most successful artist of his era in Germany. First known as Adolph Menzel, he was knighted in 1898 and changed his name to Adolph von Menzel.

His popularity in his native country, owing especially to his history paintings, was such that few of his major paintings left Germany, as many were quickly acquired by museums in Berlin. Menzel's graphic work (and especially his drawings) were more widely disseminated; these, along with informal paintings not initially intended for display, have largely accounted for his posthumous reputation.

Although he traveled in order to find subjects for his art, to visit exhibitions, and to meet with other artists, Menzel spent most of his life in Berlin, and was, despite numerous friendships, by his own admission detached from others. It is likely that he felt socially estranged for physical reasons alone—he had a large head, and stood about four foot six inches.

Biography

Career
Menzel was born to German parents in Breslau, Prussian Silesia (now Wrocław, Poland), on 8 December 1815. His father was a lithographer and intended to educate his son as a professor, but did not thwart his taste for art. After resigning his teaching post, Menzel senior set up a lithographic workshop in 1818. In 1830 the family moved to Berlin, and in 1832 Adolph was forced to take over the lithographic business on the death of his father. In 1833, he studied briefly at the Berlin Academy of Art, where he drew from plaster casts and ancient sculptures; thereafter Menzel was self-taught.   of Berlin published his first work in 1833, an album of pen-and-ink drawings reproduced on stone, to illustrate Goethe's little poem, Kunstlers Erdenwallen. He executed lithographs in the same manner to illustrate Denkwürdigkeiten aus der brandenburgisch-preussischen Geschichte; The Five Senses and The Prayer, as well as diplomas for various corporations and societies.

From 1839 to 1842, he produced 400 drawings, largely introducing to Germany the technique of wood-engraving, to illustrate the Geschichte Friedrichs des Grossen (History of Frederick the Great) by Franz Kugler. He subsequently brought out Friedrichs der Grossen Armee in ihrer Uniformirung (The Uniforms of the Army under Frederick the Great), Soldaten Friedrichs der Grossen (The Soldiers of Frederick the Great); and finally, by order of King Frederick William IV, he illustrated the works of Frederick the Great, Illustrationen zu den Werken Friedrichs des Grossen (1843–1849). The artist had a deep sympathy for the Prussian king. In one of his letters to Johann Jakob Weber, he said that it was his intention to represent the monarch as a man who was both hated and admired—simply as he was, in other words, as a man of the people. Through these works, Menzel established his claim to be considered one of the first, if not actually the first, of the illustrators of his day in his own line.

Menzel's fame came from his illustrations of the 18th-century Prussian monarch, Frederick the Great. As well as dedication to adding historical accuracy and attention to detail. Menzel also made sure to do research on the items he was painting. From 1840 and onward Menzel became admirable for his small paintings and drawings. In which he depicted his unconventional ideas.

In the meantime, Menzel had also begun to study, unaided, the art of painting, and he soon produced a great number and variety of pictures. His paintings consistently demonstrated keen observation and honest workmanship in subjects dealing with the life and achievements of Frederick the Great, and scenes of everyday life, such as In the Tuileries, The Ball Supper, and At Confession. Among those considered most important of these works are Iron Rolling Mill (1872–1875)  and The Market-place at Verona. When invited to paint The Coronation of William I at Koenigsberg, he produced an exact representation of the ceremony without regard to the traditions of official painting.

During Menzel's life, his paintings were appreciated by Otto von Bismarck and William I, and after his death they were appropriated for use as electoral posters by Adolf Hitler.

If these historical illustrations anticipated the qualities of early Impressionism, it is paintings such as The French Window and The Palace Garden of Prince Albert, both painted in the mid- 1840s, that now appeal as "among the most freely observed of mid-nineteenth century images." Such genre paintings evidence associations with French and English art. Though he was primarily an excellent draughtsman, art historian Julius Meier-Graefe considered him to be a "proto-impressionist" painter, whose graphic work hindered his painterly potentials. Private drawings and watercolors made of dead and dying soldiers in 1866 on the battlefields of the Austro-Prussian War are unsparing in their realism, and have been described by art historian Marie Ursula Riemann-Reyher as "unique in German art of the time."

Later years

The paintings which were available to the public garnered recognition not only within Germany, but from the French avant-garde as well: Edgar Degas admired and copied his work, calling him "the greatest living master", and Louis Edmond Duranty wrote of his art:

In a word, the man is everywhere independent, sincere, with sure vision, a decisive note that can sometimes be a little brutal....While being perfectly healthy he has the neurosis of truthfulness....The man who has measured with a compass the buttons on a uniform from the time of Frederick, when it is a matter of depicting a modern shoe, waistcoat, or coiffure, does not make them by approximations but totally, in their absolute form and without smallness of means. He puts there everything that is called for by the character (of the object). Free, large, and rapid in his drawing, no draftsman is as definitive as he.

Notwithstanding Menzel's professed estrangement from others, his renown entailed social obligations, and in the 1880s the poet Jules Laforgue described him as "no taller than a cuirassier-guard's boot, bedecked with pendants and orders, not missing a single one of these parties, moving among all these personages like a gnome and like the greatest enfant terrible for the chronicler." In Germany he received many honors, and in 1898 became the first painter to be admitted to the Order of the Black Eagle; by virtue of receiving the Order, Menzel was raised to the nobility, becoming "Adolph von Menzel".  He was also made a member of the Académie des Beaux-Arts in Paris and the Royal Academy in London. After his death in 1905 in Berlin, his funeral arrangements were directed by the Kaiser, who walked behind his coffin.

Exhibitions (selection)
"Adolph Menzel 1815–1905. Das Labyrinth der Wirklichkeit", Nationalgalerie (National Gallery) and Kupferstichkabinett (Museum of Prints and Drawings), Staatliche Museen zu Berlin – Preußischer Kulturbesitz, 7 Feb – 11 May 1997
"Menzel. Maler auf Papier", Kupferstichkabinett (Museum of Prints and Drawings), Staatliche Museen zu Berlin – Preußischer Kulturbesitz, 20 September 2019 – 19 January 2020.

World War II

Several important works by Menzel were seized, sold by force or under duress during the Nazi period. Some of these have been restituted in the 21st century. 

 In 2014, the Menzel's Stehende Rüstungen (1886) ("Standing Suits of Armour" or "Armoury Fantasy")  was restituted by the Albertina Museum in Vienna to the heirs of Adele Pächter, who was murdered at the Theresienstadt concentration camp. 
 In 2015, the Menzel pastel "Lady with a Red Blouse" was restituted to the heirs of Erna Felicia and Hans Lachmann-Mosse.   Oskar Reinhart had purchased the pastel from the art dealer Fritz Nathan in Munich in 1934 and donated it to the Foundation in 1940.
 Others have been claimed but not restituted. Also in 2015 the Dutch Limbach Commission refused a restitution request for the Menzel painting "A Weekday in Paris" which had belonged to the Jewish banker Georges Behrens. 
In 2017 Germany's Culture Minister Monika Gruetter returned Menzel's Interior of a Gothic Church  to the heirs of Elsa Cohen who, persecuted by the Nazis because Jewish, sold it to Hitler's art dealer Hildebrand Gurlitt in 1938. It was rediscovered in the art stash of his son, Cornelius Gurlitt.

The German Lost Art Foundation lists numerous Menzel artworks on its website.

Gallery

Notes

Selected bibliography 
 Karl Scheffler, Adolf Menzel: Der Mensch, das Werk. Berlin: Cassirer, 1915.
 Elfried Bock, Adolph Menzel: Verzeichnis seines graphischen Werkes. Berlin: Amsler & Ruthardt, 1923.
 Werner Schmidt, Adolf Menzel: Zeichnungen Verzeichnis und Erläuterungen. National-Galerie, Staatliche Museen, Berlin, 1955.
 Ulrich Bischoff, Jens Christian Jensen, Richard Hoppe-Sailer, Wulf Schadendorf, Johann Schlick, Jürgen Schultze, Adolph Menzel: Realist – Historist – Maler des Hofes. Exhibition catalog. Schweinfurt: Weppert, 1981.
 Gisela Hopp, Eckhard Schaar, Werner Hofmann, eds., Menzel – der Beobachter. Exhibition catalog. Munich: Prestel, 1982.
 Jost Hermand, Adolph Menzel mit Selbstzeugnissen und Bilddokumenten (Rowohlts Monographien, vol. 361). Reinbek bei Hamburg: Rowohlt, 1986.
 Gisold Lammel, Adolph Menzel. Frideriziana und Wilhelmiana. Dresden: Verlag der Kunst, 1987.
 Claude Keisch and Marie Ursula Riemann-Reyher, eds.: Adolph Menzel 1815–1905: Between Romanticism and Impressionism. London and New Haven: Yale University Press, 1996.
 Michaela Diener, „Ein Fürst der Kunst ist uns gestorben“: Adolph von Menzels Nachruhm im Kaiserlichen Deutschland (1905–1910). Regensburg: Roderer, 1998.
 Hubertus Kohle, Adolph Menzels Friedrichbilder: Theorie und Praxis der Geschichtsmalerei im Berlin der 1850er Jahre. Munich and Berlin: Deutscher Kunstverlag, 2001.
 Christina Grummt, Adolph Menzel – zwischen Kunst und Konvention, die Allegorie in der Adressenkunst des 19. Jahrhunderts. Berlin: Reimer, 2001.
 Michael Fried, Menzel's Realism: Art and Embodiment in Nineteenth-Century Berlin. London and New Haven: Yale University Press, 2002.
 Jens Christian Jensen, Adolph Menzel. Cologne: DuMont, 2003.
 Werner Busch, Adolph Menzel: Leben und Werk. Munich: Beck, 2004.
 Bernhard Maaz, ed., Adolph Menzel radikal real. Munich: Hirmer, 2008.
 Werner Busch, Adolph Menzel: Auf der Suche nach der Wirklichkeit. Munich: Beck, 2015.
 Anja Grebe, Menzel, Maler der Moderne. Berlin: Verlag Eisengold, 2015.
 Claudia Czok, "Menzel, Adolph (Adolph Friedrich Erdmann von)", in De Gruyter: Allgemeines Künstlerlexikon: Die Bildenden Künstler aller Zeiten und Völker, vol. 89. Berlin and Boston: De Gruyter, 2016, pp. 117–121.

References
 
 Eisler, Colin. Masterworks in Berlin: A City's Paintings Reunited. Bulfinch, 1996. 
 Fried, Michael. Menzel's Realism: Art and Embodiment in Nineteenth-Century Berlin. London and New Haven: Yale University Press, 2002. 
 Keisch, Claude, et al. Adolph Menzel 1815–1905: Between Romanticism and Impressionism. London and New Haven: Yale University Press, 1996.

External links 

 German masters of the nineteenth century: paintings and drawings from the Federal Republic of Germany, a full text exhibition catalog from The Metropolitan Museum of Art, which contains material on Adolph Menzel (no. 60–64)
 Degas: The Artist's Mind, exhibition catalog from The Metropolitan Museum of Art fully available online as PDF, which contains material on Adolph Menzel (see index)
 

German printmakers
German male painters
German history painters
German untitled nobility
People from the Province of Silesia
Artists from Wrocław
German war artists
1815 births
1905 deaths
19th-century war artists
Prussian Academy of Arts alumni
Burials at Dreifaltigkeitsfriedhof I, Berlin
Honorary Members of the Royal Academy
Recipients of the Pour le Mérite (civil class)